Fousseiny Tangara (born 12 June 1978) is a Malian former professional footballer who played as a goalkeeper.

Playing career
Born  in Bamako, Tangara's parents moved to Vanves, Hauts-de-Seine, France when he was aged six months. He began playing football with lower league sides FC Versailles 78, FC Les Lilas and FC Mantes, before moving up to play in Ligue 2 with Amiens SC.

He was part of the Malian 2004 Olympic football team, who exited in the quarter finals, finishing top of group A, but losing to Italy in the next round.

References

External links
Name is Fousseni at fifa.com

1978 births
Living people
Malian footballers
Association football goalkeepers
Amiens SC players
Footballers at the 2004 Summer Olympics
Olympic footballers of Mali
FC Gueugnon players
FC Versailles 78 players
Ligue 2 players
2004 African Cup of Nations players
Sportspeople from Bamako
CA Paris-Charenton players
FC Les Lilas players
FC Mantois 78 players
AS Beauvais Oise players
AC Amiens players
Malian expatriate footballers
Expatriate footballers in France
Malian expatriate sportspeople in France
Expatriate footballers in Belgium
Malian expatriate sportspeople in Belgium
Mali international footballers
21st-century Malian people